The black-headed bulbul (Brachypodius melanocephalos) is a member of the bulbul family, Pycnonotidae. It is found in forests in south-eastern Asia.

Taxonomy and systematics

The black-headed bulbul was originally described in the genus Turdus. It was later moved to the large bulbul genus Pycnonotus as Pycnonotus atriceps.  Pycnonotus was found to be polyphyletic in recent molecular phylogeny studies and the species transferred to Brachypodius with the species epithet melanocephalos, which has priority over atriceps.

Until 2008, the Andaman bulbul was considered as a subspecies of the black-headed bulbul.

Subspecies

Four subspecies are recognized:

 B. m. melanocephalos (Gmelin, JF, 1788) [synonym B. m. atriceps (Temminck, 1822)]: found in north-eastern India and Bangladesh though Southeast Asia to the Greater Sunda Islands and western Philippines
 B. m. hyperemnus (Oberholser, 1912): Found on western Sumatran islands
 B. m. baweanus Finsch, 1901: originally described as a separate species. Found on Bawean (north of Java)
 B. m. hodiernus (Bangs & Peters, JL, 1927): originally described as a separate species. Found on Maratua Island (off eastern Borneo)

Description

The black-headed bulbul has a mainly olive-yellow plumage with a glossy bluish-black head. A grey morph where most of the olive-yellow is replaced by grey also exists. It resembles the black-crested bulbul, but has blue eyes (though not reliable in juveniles), a broad yellow tip to the tail, and never shows a crest (however, some subspecies of the black-crested are also essentially crestless, but they have red or yellow throats).

Behavior and ecology

The black-headed bulbul feeds mainly on small fruit and berries, but will also take insects. It commonly occurs in small flocks of 6-8 individuals.

References

black-headed bulbul
Birds of Southeast Asia
black-headed bulbul
Taxobox binomials not recognized by IUCN